The College Park–North Bethesda Line, designated Route C8, is a bus route that operates Monday to Saturday that is operated by the Washington Metropolitan Area Transit Authority, United States, between College Park–University of Maryland station of the Green and Yellow Lines and North Bethesda station of the Red Line of the Washington Metro. The line operates every 30 minutes at all times. Trips are roughly 60 - 80 minutes long.

Current Route
Route C8 operates between College Park and North Bethesda stations from Monday through Saturday with no Sunday service. The C8 operates out of Montgomery division at all times.

C8 stops

History
Route C8 was known for two different lines, prior to its current line being named under the Aspen Hill Road-Montgomery Mall Line and Glenmont-College Park Line.

Aspen Hill Road–Montgomery Mall Line
C8 originally operated as part of the former Aspen Hill Road–Montgomery Mall Line between Aspen Hill, Maryland and Montgomery Mall from February 19, 1978, until 1996. Until January 27, 1985, the route operated from Layhill to Congressional Plaza in Rockville. Starting in the early 1990s, some Saturday trips would terminate at the National Capital Trolley Museum. Beginning on June 28, 1992, weekday off-peak and Saturday service would be operated by Montgomery County's Ride On bus system. The route was discontinued in 1996, and was replaced by Ride On bus route 26.

Glenmont–College Park Line
Route C8 was then reincarnated on July 25, 1998, to operate as part of WMATA's new Glenmont–College Park Line. The line was created at the request of the Action Committee for Transit in February, 1998, which sought to enhance transportation between University of Maryland, College Park and Washington Metro stations that are located in the upper northwestern region of Montgomery County, Maryland. The Action Committee for Transit had a very strong ambition for the C8 to operate all the way between College Park–University of Maryland station & White Flint station, via Glenmont station between Monday-Saturday.

WMATA initially began operating the C8 between College Park and the newly opened Glenmont station during weekday peak-hours only, as an experimental route as WMATA wasn't sure if the new route would be successful in drawing enough riders to be able to sustain the route. The route mostly operated along River Road, Paint Branch Parkway, Campus, Adelphi Road, New Hampshire Avenue, Randolph Road, and Georgia Avenue. If the route succeeded, the line would become permanent and can be extended to White Flint station.

Changes
On July 18, 1999, as a result of the success of the route in attracting a high volume of riders, WMATA made the C8 a permanent Metrobus route. WMATA also all all day on weekday and Saturday service, as opposed to operating only during rush hours in order to meet the Action Committee for Transit's request for the C8 to operate more frequently throughout the day and Saturdays.

On January 13, 2001, WMATA finally meet the full request of the Action Committee for Transit, of extending the C8 route beyond Glenmont station, to White Flint station along Randolph Road replacing Ride On route 40. As a result, the name of the route was changed to the College Park-White Flint Line.

During WMATA's 2011 Fiscal Year, route C8 was proposed to be rerouted to operate to Prince George's Plaza station instead of College Park–University of Maryland station to replace route R3. It was also proposed to divert Food and Drug Administration and Federal Research Center in White Oak, Maryland and into Archives II in College Park, Maryland. But route C8 would revert to a weekday peak hour route only discontinuing all midday, weekday evening, and Saturday service. This would lead to a loss of ridership for the C8 since it will only have reduced weekday service instead of Monday through Saturday service.

On June 17, 2012, route C8 was rerouted to divert off the intersection of Adelphi Road and directly enter the National Archives at College Park, replacing route R3. Route C8 also diverted into the Food and Drug Administration and Federal Research Center. Route C8 would skip its diversion into both the National Archives Building and White Oak FDA/FRC building on Saturdays as both buildings were closed.

In 2016 as part of WMATA's FY2018 budget, it was proposed to eliminate the C8 segment between Glenmont station and  White Flint station in order to reduce costs. Performance measures according to WMATA goes as follows:

 Discontinued segment averages 591 eastbound weekday boardings (19.1 per trip) and 401 westbound weekday boardings (12.5 per trip) according to WMATA automatic passenger counter data, which, accounts for 44.4% of eastbound boardings and 26.6% of westbound boardings.
 Discontinued segment averages 354 eastbound Saturday boardings (9.1 per trip) and 248 westbound Saturday boardings (7.8 per trip) according to WMATA automatic passenger counter data, which, accounts for 46.2% of eastbound boardings and 29.7% of westbound boardings.

On July 29, 2017, Saturday service to National Archives at College Park was discontinued due to the National Archives was now closed during Saturdays. Route C8 would skip the diversion on Saturdays but still serve the diversion on weekdays.

Beginning on September 1, 2019 for nine months, the College Park Metrobus loop was temporarily closed for construction of the Purple line at College Park station having all stops located along River Road. As of  result, route C8 was temporarily rerouted along River Road having to turn around on the roundabout along Haig Drive to return to its regular route going to White Flint.

During the COVID-19 pandemic, route C8 was reduced to operate on its Saturday schedule beginning on March 16, 2020. However beginning on March 18, 2020, all route C8 service was suspended once WMATA reduced its Metrobus services to Sunday schedule only. Route C8 resumed service on August 23, 2020 operating every hour instead of every 30 minutes.

Beginning on April 20, 2020, parts of Calvert Road was closed due to the ongoing construction of the Purple line, route C8 was temporarily rerouted along Baltimore Avenue and to turn on Calvert Road to serve the west side of College Park–University of Maryland station since vehicles cannot travel along parts of Calvert Road. However the reroute has not operated due to the 2019-20 COVID-19 outbreak and Metro's reduced service since March 16. Route C8 resumed service on August 24, 2020 running the detour along Baltimore Avenue and Calvert Road. Service to the east side resumed on June 12, 2022 with buses serving Bus Bay B.

On May 29, 2022, Route C8 was modified to operate along Old Georgetown Road, Citadel Avenue, and Marinelli Road, now terminating along Rockville Pike, adjacent to White Flint station.

On September 11, 2022, the line was changed to the College Park–North Bethesda Line due to White Flint station being renamed to North Bethesda station.

References

C8